Gallhammer were a Japanese extreme metal group that drew on blackened crust, black metal, doom metal and crust punk. They formed in Tokyo in 2003 and released three studio albums.

The current group lineup is Vivian Slaughter (vocals, bass guitar) and Risa Reaper (vocals, drums); the original lineup included Mika Penetrator (vocals, guitar).

Biography 
Their first recording, a free demo tape limited to 30 copies, was distributed at their first gig at Koiwa Death Fest Vol.2, around March 2003, in Japan. In July of the same year, the self-titled demo was released. By April of the following year, they had released another demo, Endless Nauseous Days, and were working towards their debut full-length CD. The 8-track album, entitled Gloomy Lights, was released in November 2004 through Hello From The Gutter Records.

In January 2006, Gallhammer was signed to Peaceville Records, on the recommendation of Darkthrone. A CD/DVD pack, entitled The Dawn of..., was released, containing a CD, demo and rehearsal footage, and a DVD recording of Gallhammer performing in Okayama and five concerts in Tokyo.

Gallhammer released their second full-length album, Ill Innocence, through Peaceville Records in September 2007, followed by a European tour. In March 2008, they did a second European tour. They also played at the Inferno Metal Festival in June.

For their third LP The End released in 2011 their guitarist, Mika Penetrator, was no longer present, but nevertheless the band chose to continue as a bass-drums duo. For allmusic.com´s reviewer Phil Freeman "this has changed their musical style quite a bit; the thrashing punk metal of 2004's Gloomy Lights and 2007's Ill Innocence can still be heard on songs like "Rubbish CG202" and "Entropy G35," but tracks like "Aberration," "Sober," and the title cut are totally different—slow, sludgy death marches that owe more to Flipper and the Melvins than black metal."

Gallhammer appeared in Nocturno Culto's film The Misanthrope: The Existence of Solitude and Chaos.

Influences 
In an interview with Contraband Candy, Vivian Slaughter cited Hellhammer, Celtic Frost, Amebix and Burzum as Gallhammer's main musical influences. Slaughter is also a passionate fan of Judas Priest, and once called Corrupted "the greatest band in the world". She says she was first inspired to play music after seeing Napalm Death and Painkiller in concert.

Lisa Reaper is a fan of old school techno, krautrock, Kraftwerk and Laibach.

The band's other influences include Joy Division, Antisect, Carcass, Cathedral, Morbid Angel and Scorn. The group is also inspired by Japanoise and have collaborated with Incapacitants.

While the group borrows from crust and anarcho-punk, they do not identify with a particular political outlook.

Members 
Current
 Vivian Slaughter – lead vocals, bass
 Lisa Reaper – drums, backing vocals

Former
 Mika Penetrator – guitars, backing vocals (2003–2010)

Discography 
Studio albums
Gloomy Lights (2003)
Ill Innocence (2007)
The End (2011)

Other albums
The First Reh-Tape (demo) (2003)
Gallhammer (demo) (2003)
Endless Nauseous Days (demo) (2004)
Beyond The Hatred (EP) (2007)
The Dawn of... (compilation) (2007)
A Taste of Despair (EP) (2010)

Videos
The Dawn of... (2007)
Ruin of a Church (2008)

References

External links 

Official Blog
Official Myspace
Gallhammer at Peaceville Records

Japanese black metal musical groups
Japanese doom metal musical groups
Japanese crust and d-beat groups
Musical groups established in 2003
All-female punk bands
Japanese musical trios
Musical groups from Tokyo
Peaceville Records artists
2003 establishments in Japan